Belait Swamp Forest is a 25,000 ha tract of forested land in the Belait District of Brunei in north-western Borneo. It has been identified by BirdLife International as an Important Bird Area (IBA). It contains peat swamp, mixed dipterocarp, and tropical heath forest.

Birds
The site was identified as an IBA because it supports significant numbers of the populations of various threatened bird species, including black partridges, Bornean crestless firebacks, large green pigeons, Storm's storks, Wallace's hawk-eagles, wrinkled hornbills, Malay blue-banded kingfishers, blue-headed and fairy pittas, Bornean bristleheads, hook-billed and straw-headed bulbuls, and large-billed blue-flycatchers.

Conservation
The IBA contains some forest reserves, but as a whole is vulnerable to habitat fragmentation from pipeline and road construction, and by wildfire.

References

Important Bird Areas of Brunei
Belait District
Sundaland heath forests
Borneo lowland rain forests
Borneo peat swamp forests